The Western Canada Concept was a Canadian political party.  It was founded in 1980, and promoted the separation from Canada of all provinces and territories west of Ontario.

The WCC attained its greatest notoriety in Alberta, where it succeeded in electing an MLA to the provincial legislature in 1982.  It was also active in the other western provinces, however, and ran provincial candidates in Manitoba in a 1984 by-election and the 1986 general election.  Its Manitoba leader was Fred Cameron.

In 1984, Cameron stood for a by-election in the Winnipeg riding of Fort Garry, and received 186 votes.  In the following general election, he stood against Gary Doer in Concordia and received 204 votes.  There were five WCC candidates in this election, the minimum required for official ballot status.  Their combined vote total was 672.

In 1987, a number of disgruntled WCC members in Alberta formed the new Western Independence Party.  Cameron joined this new organization, and appears to have taken most of Manitoba's WCC membership with him.  It is unclear if the party simply changed its name, or if the Manitoba WIP was formed by secessionists from the WCC. In any event, the Manitoba WCC does not appear to have existed past 1987.

See also:  Canadian political parties

Provincial political parties in Manitoba
Defunct political parties in Canada
Political parties established in 1980
1980 establishments in Manitoba